Agyneta vera is a species of sheet weaver found in Queensland, Australia. It was described by Wunderlich in 1976.

References

vera
Fauna of Queensland
Spiders of Australia
Spiders described in 1976